Drexel Heights is an unincorporated community and census-designated place (CDP) in Pima County, Arizona, United States. The population was 27,749 at the 2010 census.

The area is said to be named after financier Francis Anthony Drexel, the father of Saint Katharine Drexel (who established missions to Blacks and Native Americans throughout the United States). Drexel is said to have owned property in the Drexel Heights area and eastward during the late 19th century, although no proof has ever been found that he owned land in the area. Francis A. Drexel died in 1885.

In an article in the Arizona Daily Star newspaper, on March 4, 2014, historian David Leighton stated that Drexel Road was named after Katharine Drexel, and that her father Francis A. Drexel didn't own land in the area as has been claimed in the past. While Mr. Leighton, didn't directly state that Drexel Heights was named in honor of Saint Katharine Drexel, it is implied in his statement that it is named in her honor.

Geography
Drexel Heights is located at  (32.138989, -111.043926).

The area has numerous Saguaro cacti, and is positioned only a couple of miles south of the Saguaro National Park. The northern boundary of Drexel Heights is the Tucson Mountain Park. It is cut off from the rest of Tucson due to the topography of the Tucson Mountains, which are only crossed via a small number of roads: Ajo Highway is the main crossing, with Gates Pass providing a more scenic route. Coyotes and Javalinas are commonly sighted in the area.

Demographics

As of the census of 2000, there were 23,849 people, 7,505 households, and 5,988 families residing in the CDP. The racial makeup of the CDP was 58.1% White, 2.6% Black or African American, 3.4% Native American, 0.8% Asian, 0.1% Pacific Islander, 31.3% from other races, and 3.6% from two or more races. 60.1% of the population were Hispanic or Latino of any race.

In the CDP, the population was spread out, with 31.9% under the age of 18, 9.4% from 18 to 24, 28.6% from 25 to 44, 22.0% from 45 to 64, and 8.1% who were 65 years of age or older. The median age was 32 years. For every 100 females, there were 97.1 males. For every 100 females age 18 and over, there were 92.1 males.

As of the census of 2010, The racial makeup of the CDP was 58.6% White, 2.5% Black or African American, 2.3% Native American, 0.7% Asian, 0.1% Pacific Islander, 28.5% from other races, and 4.3% from two or more races. 70.6% of the population were Hispanic or Latino of any race.
There were 8,824 households, out of which 57.2% had children under the age of 18 living with them, 59.8% were married couples living together, 17.2% had a female householder with no husband present, and 23.0% were non-families. 17.2% of all households were made up of individuals, and 2.4% had someone living alone who was 65 years of age or older. The average household size was 3.14 and the average family size was 3.54.

Ecology
Drexel Heights enjoys abundant urban wildlife but not everyone enjoys it. The  has decided to release captured nuisance wildlife near town to avoid excessive ecological disruption, but this has increased the number of animals returning to the originally reported location.

References

External links
 David Leighton, "Street Smarts: Generous nun the namesake for Drexel Road," Arizona Daily Star, Feb. 4, 2014

Census-designated places in Pima County, Arizona
Populated places in the Sonoran Desert